Sophia of Loon (c. 1044/46 - b. 1075; Hungarian: Loozi Zsófia; Dutch: Sofia van Loon; French: Sophie de Looz) was the Queen of Hungary, the first wife of Géza I of Hungary. According to the old Hungarian sources, she was the daughter of the  Limburg duke Arnulf, the son of Rudolph, duke of Limburg, and countess Luitgard of Namur. In reality Arnulf might be Arnulf, Count of Holland, the father of Dirk III (the maternal great-grandfather of Sophia of Loon) or Arnulf of Haspinga (her paternal grandfather); and Luitgard might be Luitgarde of Namur,	her paternal grandmother; thus, Rodolph was her paternal great-grandfather (see the ancestry chart below), who can possibly be identified with Richwin II, Castelijn of Baelen-Limbourg (1033).

Family 

She may have been the daughter of Emmo of Loon, the third count of the County of Loon, and his wife Swanhilde, the daughter of Dirk III, Count of Holland, and Othelindis (c. 985-1043/44), who in turn was the daughter of Bernard I of Saxony.

Marriage and issue 

Sometime around 1062 or 1063, Sophie married the Hungarian prince Géza, the later Géza I of Hungary. It is believed that they may have met in the court of the Holy Roman Emperor, where Géza was sent as a hostage in 1062–1063, at which time he must have been unmarried in line with the custom of not sending married men as hostages to foreign courts.

Sophia probably died soon after her husband became king (1074-1077), since Géza in 1075 had already another wife, the Byzantine princess  Synadene.

According to the sources, they had seven children, but not all of them reached adulthood.

Sophia and Géza had the issue:

Kálmán (c. 1065/70-1116), King of Hungary
Álmos (c. 1068/71-1127, in Byzance), claimant to the throne
Katalin (may also be the daughter of Géza's second wife, Synadene)

Only these names survived. In addition to them, two more sons died in infancy, and probably three daughters reached the adulthood. One of them became the mother of ispán Bors, a claimant to the Hungarian throne (exiled to Byzantium), while another daughter became the mother of Iván, a claimant to the Hungarian throne (executed in c. 1130).

Ancestry

References

Sources 
Magyarország és Erdély királyai, királynői, fejedelmei és kormányzói. Budapest: Helikon Kiadó.
Nógrády, Árpád, Pálffy, Géza, Velkey, Ferenc (2007): Magyar uralkodók. Debrecen: Tóth Könyvkereskedés és Kiadó Kft. p. 14.
Sokop, Brigitte (1993): Stammtafeln europäischer Herrscherhäuser. 3. Aufl. Böhlau, Wien, .
Magyar Katolikus Lexikon

External links 
 

1040s births
1070s deaths
11th-century Hungarian people
Hungarian queens consort